Majed Al-Mutairi (born 24 March 1991) is a Saudi football player who plays as a right back.

References

External links
 

1991 births
Living people
Saudi Arabian footballers
Hajer FC players
Al Batin FC players
Al-Shoulla FC players
Al-Ain FC (Saudi Arabia) players
Al Jeel Club players
Al-Sadd FC (Saudi football club) players
Saudi First Division League players
Saudi Professional League players
Saudi Second Division players
Association football fullbacks